C150, C-150 or variation, may refer to:

Transportation and vehicles

Aviation
 Cessna 150 (C-150); an AvGas propeller-driven two-seat high-wing tricycle-gear general-aviation light-aircraft airplane
 Cessna 150/152
 Bombardier CSeries C150, later CS500, renamed Airbus A220-500; regional jet airliner
 Caudron C.150; a French airplane

Automotive
 Centurion C-150, a crew-cab truck variant of the Ford Bronco
 Chevrolet 150, a 1950s economy fleet car

Other uses
 Olympus C-150, a digital camera
 Bill C-150, a Canadian federal law, a 1960s omnibus bill that modified the Canadian Criminal Code
 ASTM C150, a portland cement standard

See also

 Airbus CC-150 Polaris, RCAF multipurpose A310 variant
 Kapawe'no 150C or Halcro 150C (Indian Reserve 150C), a Canadian Indian reserve in Alberta
 C15 (disambiguation)
 150 (disambiguation)

Letter-number combination disambiguation pages